Serie A2 may refer to:

 Serie A2 Basket (named Legadue Basket from 2001 to 2013, and DNA Gold Basket from 2013 to 2014), second-highest level of professional club basketball in Italy
 Serie A2 (baseball), second-highest level of professional club baseball in Italy
 Serie A2 (football), second-highest level of the Sanmarinese football league system (defunct)
 Serie A2 (ice hockey), second-highest level of ice hockey in Italy
 Serie A2 (men's water polo), second division of the Italian water polo male national championship